is a passenger railway station located in the city of Fukaya, Saitama, Japan, operated by the East Japan Railway Company (JR East). It is also a freight depot for the Japan Freight Railway Company (JR Freight).

Lines
Okabe Station is served by the Takasaki Line, with through Shōnan-Shinjuku Line and Ueno-Tokyo Line services to and from the Tokaido Line.

Layout
The station consists of two island platforms serving four tracks, connected to the station building by an underground passage. The station is staffed.

Platforms

 Platforms 2 and 4 serve as side tracks for terminating trains.

History 
The station opened on 16 December 1909. The station became part of the JR East network after the privatization of the JNR on 1 April 1987.

Passenger statistics
In fiscal 2019, the station was used by an average of 3183 passengers daily (boarding passengers only).

Surrounding area
former Okabe Town Hall
Okabe Post Office
Saitama Institute of Technology

See also
List of railway stations in Japan

References

External links

JR East Okabe Station

Railway stations in Saitama Prefecture
Railway stations in Japan opened in 1909
Takasaki Line
Shōnan-Shinjuku Line
Stations of East Japan Railway Company
Stations of Japan Freight Railway Company
Fukaya, Saitama